Belverdi may refer to:
 Belverdi-ye Jadid
 Belverdi-ye Qadim